Prime House is a historic home located at Huntington in Suffolk County, New York. It is a -story, five-bay, gable-roofed clapboard structure with a shed roof rear extension. It was built as a two-family workers' residence in 1855 and was representative of the late settlement period of Huntington. The house is next door to the Prime-Octagon House, and across the street from the Heckscher Museum of Art.

It was added to the National Register of Historic Places in 1985.

References

Houses on the National Register of Historic Places in New York (state)
Houses completed in 1855
Houses in Suffolk County, New York
National Register of Historic Places in Huntington (town), New York